McLean County Unit District No. 5 (legally Community Unit School District No. 5, usually shortened to Unit 5) is a unit school district in McLean County, Illinois and a small portion of Woodford County, Illinois.

A public election on 8 May 1948 created the school district.  The district covers 11 congressional townships, including all of the communities of Carlock, Hudson, Normal, and Towanda.  It also covers parts of Bloomington not in Bloomington Public Schools District 87.

, the district has around 13,000 students and 1,850 full- and part-time staff across 17 elementary, 4 junior high, and 2 high school buildings.  The two high schools are Normal Community High School and Normal Community West High School.

As of 2022, the district faces a multimillion dollar debt. The district has attempted to remove popular student programs to attempt to pay the debt. One of which is the 5th grade band program - at the board meeting intending to remove the program, extreme backlash and 75 public speakers caused the meeting to last well into the next day and evoke the cancellation. Job positions are also being cut. Many students and parents are concerned about the nature of these decisions as they seem to be irrational and target the artistic side of the district rather than the sports side, where many teams exist.

Schools

Elementary schools
Benjamin Elementary School
Brigham Elementary School
Carlock Elementary School 
Cedar Ridge Elementary School
Fairview Elementary School
Fox Creek Elementary School
Glenn Elementary School
Grove Elementary School
Colene Hoose Elementary School
Hudson Elementary School
Northpoint Elementary School
Oakdale Elementary School
Parkside Elementary School
Pepper Ridge Elementary School
Prairieland Elementary School
Sugar Creek Elementary School
Towanda Elementary School

Junior high schools
 Chiddix Junior High School
 Evans Junior High School
 Kingsley Junior High School
 Parkside Junior High School

Kingsley Junior High School is a public school in Normal, Illinois that opened in 2003. It was used as Normal Community High School until they moved across town in 2003. The mascot is the Cougars and the school colors are orange and black. The mascot was changed from the Cavaliers to the Cougars in the 2021-22 school year, on the grounds that the Cavaliers does not represent everyone. However, students have not embraced this change, and still wear Cavalier merchandise. Though unknown who chose the new mascot, it is likely that the Cougar mascot was selected by students due to its alternate meaning. The school made an attempt to change every Cavalier logo, but multiple sources note this is not the case. Although all Cavalier murals were painted over, hallway signs and sports chairs still bear the former mascot's logo. This is likely due to the Unit 5 budget cuts / Unit 5 debt struggle which removed 8th grade foreign language and nearly removed 5th grade band. 

They have won one state title in 8th Grade Volleyball in 2006 and the 2007 8th Grade Basketball team were the runners-up in the State Tournament. The 2008 8th Grade Girls Cross Country team also made it to State. The 2008 6th and 7th Grade Girls Basketball team were the runners-up in the State Tournament. In 2009 the 8th Grade Girls Basketball team placed 4th in state. Their cheerleading and poms team are well known as well. The poms team placed 7th in the nation after competing in Orlando, Florida for the U.D.A. National Championship 2010. In the 2010–2011 school year, Kingsley had their 8th grade boys baseball team get 3rd in state. The 7th grade girls basketball team won the state championship. Next to continue, the boys 7th grade basketball team also won the state title. Finally, the 8th grade boys basketball team won the state championship and gave Kingsley the record for most state championships in basketball for one year. In the 2011–2012 school season, the 7th grade girls basketball team won 2nd in the state tournament, and the 8th grade girls earned back to back state titles as the 2011 champions. The 8th grade boys have a chance for repeat titles as well, as they return to once again meet up with Bolingbrook Jane Adams for a repeat championship game match up to take home the 1st place title again. But now that the state championship is over, we can proudly announce that KJHS 8th grade boys basketball DID win 1st in the state.

High schools
Normal Community High School
Normal Community West High School

School Hours
Elementary Schools
Regular Daily: 7:45 am to 2:30 pm
Late Starts: 8:45 am to 2:30 pm

High Schools
Regular Daily: 8:30 am to 3:30 pm
Late Starts: 9:30 am to 3:30 pm

Junior High Schools
Regular Daily: 8:45 am to 3:45 pm
Late Starts: 9:45 am to 3:45 pm

References

School districts established in 1948
Education in McLean County, Illinois
School districts in Illinois
1948 establishments in Illinois